Enwrought Light is a sculpture in Bedford Park, London. It was sculpted by Conrad Shawcross and commemorates the poet W. B. Yeats who was a resident of the area for many years. It was unveiled on 6 September 2022 by Rowan Williams, the former Archbishop of Canterbury. The sculpture stands on Bath Rd and The Avenue, outside St Michael & All Angels Church at the corner of The Avenue and Bath Road.

References

2022 sculptures
Buildings and structures in Chiswick
Outdoor sculptures in London
W. B. Yeats